Operation Ignition was an operation undertaken by the Selous Scouts of the Rhodesian Army on 18 September 1976 against the forces of the guerrilla group ZIPRA Francistown.

References

Bibliography

1976 in Rhodesia
Ignition
Botswana–Rhodesia relations